BDSNi (Bahamas Domestic Submarine Network international) is a fiber optic submarine communications cable system that links the islands of the Bahamas, and also provides connectivity to Haiti via a spur connection.

Connection to Haiti 
As of 2010, BDSNi provided Haiti's only direct fibre-optic connectivity.

The spur connection to Haiti was disrupted by the 2010 Haiti earthquake, with the terminal in Port-au-Prince being completely destroyed.

References

External links 
 
 http://goliath.ecnext.com/coms2/gi_0199-4749481/Tyco-to-build-Bahamas-Domestic.html
 https://web.archive.org/web/20080908060627/http://www.haitiwebs.com/forums/business/41330-btc_commissions_domestic_submarine_network_inagua.html

Liberty Latin America
Communications in the Bahamas
Communications in Haiti
Submarine communications cables in the Caribbean Sea